Sir William Wheler, 1st Baronet (ca. 1611 – 6 August 1666) of the city of Westminster, was an English politician who sat in the House of Commons at various times between 1640 and 1660. He was knighted by the Lord Protector in 1657 and was made a baronet by King Charles II in 1660.

Biography
Wheler of John Wheler, of London, goldsmith, and his wife Martha (born 1585), daughter of Robert Herrick, of St. Martin's, Leicester, was "a 4th son, born in Holland" probably in 1611.

In November 1640, Wheler was elected Member of Parliament for Westbury in the Long Parliament, in which he was a member. He was a Lay Member of the Westminster Assembly in 1643. He was knighted some time before 30 January 1649. He sat until 1648 when he was excluded under Pride's Purge. He was sometime of the First Fruits office. He was knighted at Hampton Court, on 26 August 1657, by the Lord Protector Oliver Cromwell. In 1659 he represented Banffshire in the Third Protectorate Parliament.

In 1660, Wheler was elected MP for Queensborough in the Convention Parliament. He was created a baronet on 11 August 1660, with a special, remainder failing the heirs male of his body, "to Charles Wheeler [rectius Wheler], cosin to the said Sir William and the heires males of the body of the said Sir Charles".
 
Wheler left London on account of the Great Plague of London and went to Derby, where he died on 6 August 1666, at the age of 56. He was buried in All Saints in Derby where there is a monument to him which records his age at death as 66.

Sir William's cousin Charles Wheler succeeded to the baronetcy. However Sir William and Charles Wheler had fallen out, apparently over Charles urging Sir William to execute a settlement of his estates upon Charles (which he considered part of the arrangement for using his influence at court to help secure the baronetcy for Sir William), so instead of doing what Charles wanted, Sir William left the bulk of is estate to others and Charles only received an annual stipend of £120.

Family

Wheler married Elizabeth, daughter and heir of Michael Cole, of Kensington, Middlesex. She was laundress to Charles I. They had no children.  She died in the country, but was buried 20 September 1670, at St. Margaret's, Westminster.

Notes

References

 
 
 
 [Genealogist|series=[N.S., vol. ii, 202, and vol. iii, 41 and 216]

Attribution
 

 

1611 births
1666 deaths
English MPs 1640–1648
English MPs 1659
English MPs 1660
Baronets in the Baronetage of England